Bat Cave and Cascade Caverns State Nature Preserves  are two nature preserves totaling  located within the boundaries of Carter Caves State Resort Park in Carter County, Kentucky, United States. Bat Cave was dedicated as part of the Office of Kentucky Nature Preserves system on December 16, 1981, for the protection of the Indiana bat with wintering numbers estimated at 28,000. The Cascade Caverns preserve was included to protect two rare plant species in Kentucky, the mountain maple and the Canadian yew.

References

External links
Cascade Caverns State Nature Preserve
Bat Cave State Nature Preserve
Map of Cascade Caverns Preserve, Protected Planet.net

Protected areas of Carter County, Kentucky
Caves of Kentucky
Protected areas established in 1981
Nature reserves in Kentucky
Landforms of Carter County, Kentucky
1981 establishments in Kentucky